Jeffrey Louis Andra (born September 9, 1975) is a former professional baseball pitcher.

Career 
Andra attended the University of Oklahoma, where he played for the Oklahoma Sooners baseball team. He was drafted by the San Francisco Giants in the 3rd round of the 1997 Major League Baseball Draft.

Andra played in the Giants organization through 2001. He played for the Elmira Pioneers of the independent Northern League in 2002 and for the Sinon Bulls of the Chinese Professional Baseball League from 2003 through 2005.

References

External links

1975 births
American expatriate baseball players in Taiwan
Baseball pitchers
Baseball players from Kansas
Elmira Pioneers players
Fresno Grizzlies players
Living people
Oklahoma Sooners baseball players
People from Shawnee, Kansas
San Jose Giants players
Salem-Keizer Volcanoes players
Shreveport Captains players
Shreveport Swamp Dragons players
Sinon Bulls players
Sinon Bulls coaches